Blumeriella is a genus of fungi in the family Dermateaceae. The genus contain five species.

References

Dermateaceae genera